Ahiwara is a town and a nagar palika in Durg district in the Indian state of Chhattisgarh.

Demographics
As of the 2001 India census, Ahiwara had a population of 18,744. Males constitute 51% of the population and females 49%. Ahiwara has an average literacy rate of 66%, higher than the national average of 59.5%; with 59% of the males and 41% of females literate. 15% of the population is under 6 years of age.

References

Cities and towns in Durg district